The men's 10,000 metres event at the 2002 Asian Athletics Championships was held in Colombo, Sri Lanka on 9 August.

Results

References

2002 Asian Athletics Championships
10,000 metres at the Asian Athletics Championships